Larry D. Whitaker, Jr. (born July 31, 1969) is an American animator, director, screenwriter, designer, and voice actor.

Whitaker's first interest in art came around age four as he watched his father sculpt and paint. When his father bought him a pad of blank paper, he began to fill up the pages with scribbles and stick figures, and soon had filled reams of paper. He continued his enjoyment in art as he began school. His interest began to expand as he attended grade school, when he began acting classes, which he continued into college. He attended the University of Oklahoma, and later California Institute of the Arts (Cal-Arts). After attending Cal-Arts, he immediately began working at Warner Bros. Animation on Steven Spielberg Presents Tiny Toons, soon moving onto feature films as well.

External links
 
 

American animators
American animated film directors
American animated film producers
Living people
1969 births
American male voice actors